Ruben Gomez (born 26 January 1984) is an Argentine footballer who plays for Zaria Bălți.

Career 
He has been attached to FC Metalurh Donetsk in Ukraine, although has been out on loan since 2005.
On January 30, 2012 he signed a 3.5-year contract with SC Tavriya Simferopol.

Notes

External links
 Rubén Marcelo Gómez at BDFA.com.ar 
 
 
 

1984 births
Living people
People from Adrogué
Argentine footballers
Argentine expatriate footballers
Ukrainian Premier League players
Ukrainian Second League players
Belgian Pro League players
Super League Greece players
Cypriot First Division players
Moldovan Super Liga players
Club Atlético Belgrano footballers
FC Zorya Luhansk players
K.V. Mechelen players
FC Stal Alchevsk players
FC Hoverla Uzhhorod players
AEK Larnaca FC players
FC Metalurh Donetsk players
FC Metalurh-2 Donetsk players
SC Tavriya Simferopol players
Levadiakos F.C. players
CSF Bălți players
Expatriate footballers in Ukraine
Expatriate footballers in Belgium
Expatriate footballers in Cyprus
Expatriate footballers in Greece
Expatriate footballers in Moldova
Argentine expatriate sportspeople in Ukraine
Argentine expatriate sportspeople in Belgium
Argentine expatriate sportspeople in Cyprus
Argentine expatriate sportspeople in Greece
Argentine expatriate sportspeople in Moldova
Association football midfielders
Sportspeople from Buenos Aires Province